is a railway station in Fuchū, Aki District, Hiroshima Prefecture, Japan.

Lines
West Japan Railway Company
Sanyō Main Line

Layout
4 tracks, 2 side platforms and station office are on ground. Only track 1 and 4 have platforms. Track 2 and 3 are used for freight trains. Station office lies at track 1 side (south) and 2 platforms connected by footbridge. This station do not have the north entrance.

Railway stations in Hiroshima Prefecture
Sanyō Main Line
Railway stations in Japan opened in 1920